Pete Bremy (born October 15, 1952) is an American rock bass player. He is best known for his associations with Vanilla Fudge and Cactus.

Biography

Originally from Paterson, Bremy is a lifelong resident of New Jersey. He started singing at a very early age, and when his mother's friend, opera singer Lupe Landin, heard him sing she encouraged his mother to provide him with music lessons. He played music on and off through school. He got serious about music when he, as so many others, heard the Beatles. Ringo Starr inspired him to play drums and Bremy became a drummer for some local garage bands. He also took up bass in his early teens, inspired by Paul McCartney and Vanilla Fudge bassist, Tim Bogert. He received formal music training at William Paterson University. Here he met jazz great Thad Jones from whom he received more training.

Bremy spent most of his career as a local New Jersey musician, but got a break in 1997 when he met original Vanilla Fudge lead guitarist Vince Martell and in 1999 was recruited for the Vince Martell band where he has been a member ever since.

In January 2002, as Vanilla Fudge was set to embark on tour, Fudge bassist Tim Bogert suddenly became ill and Bremy was called to sub for him on less than 24 hours' notice. As Bogert remained ill for many months, Bremy continued to tour with Vanilla Fudge for most of the year.

In 2004, Bremy toured with singer/songwriter Essra Mohawk. Her album Primordial Lovers was rated by Rolling Stone as one of the top 25 albums of all time. He toured again with Mohawk in 2005.

In 2008, Tim Bogert once again became ill and Bremy substituted for him once again, but this time it was with Cactus.

In 2010, Bremy became a member of Vanilla Fudge when Bogert retired. The next year, a reunited Cactus, which is the band Vanilla Fudge drummer Carmine Appice and bassist Tim Bogert formed after Vanilla Fudge broke up in 1970, also featured Bremy. Bremy is the only non-original member that played in both bands. Cactus released Black Dawn, its first studio album in ten years in 2016. In 2016, after five years in the band touring the USA, Europe and Japan, Bremy, along with original guitarist Jim McCarty, left Cactus.

Vanilla Fudge released its first studio album in ten years also in 2015, Spirit of '67 with Bremy on bass and background vocals. Vanilla Fudge is still touring.

Since 2000, Bremy has also been a member of Vanilla Fudge lead guitarist Vince Martell's band.

Discography

Albums 
 Vince Martell of Vanilla Fudge – Vince Martell
 Psychedelic Cymbals – Vince Martell
 Vince Martell Live – Vince Martell
 Where Broken Hearts Go – Bill Pascali Project
 Adopted Son – Jeff Guenther
 Mud and Stone – Loretta Hagen
 TKO Tokyo: Live in Japan – Cactus
 An Evening in Tokyo – Cactus
 Spirit of '67 – Vanilla Fudge
 Black Dawn – Cactus

Singles 
 "You've Lost That Lovin' Feeling" – Pete Bremy
 "Above the Storm" – Pete Bremy
 "Freedom" – Billy Killoran
 "Harley Chick" – Justin Jaymes

References

 http://www.petebremy.com
 Global Bass Magazine
 Psychedelic Central

External links
Vanilla Fudge official website
Cactus official website
Vince Martell official website

1952 births
Living people
Musicians from Paterson, New Jersey
American rock bass guitarists
American male bass guitarists
Vanilla Fudge members
Cactus (American band) members
Guitarists from New Jersey
20th-century American bass guitarists
20th-century American male musicians